KCWD (96.1 FM, "Kool 96.1") is a radio station broadcasting a classic hits music format. It is licensed to Harrison, Arkansas, United States. The station is currently owned by Harrison Radio Stations. The station has obtained a construction permit from the FCC for a power increase to 50,000 watts.

References

External links

CWD
Classic hits radio stations in the United States
Radio stations established in 1990
1990 establishments in Arkansas
Harrison, Arkansas